Ivan Stepanovych Mazepa (also spelled Mazeppa; ,) was a Ukrainian military, political, and civic leader who served as the Hetman of Zaporizhian Host in 1687–1708. He was awarded a title of Prince of the Holy Roman Empire in 1707 for his efforts for the Holy League. The historical events of Mazepa's life have inspired many literary, artistic and musical works. He was famous as a patron of the arts.

Mazepa played an important role in the Battle of Poltava (1709), where after learning that Tsar Peter I intended to relieve him as acting Hetman (military leader) of Zaporozhian Host (a Cossack state) and to replace him with Alexander Menshikov, he defected from his army and sided with King Charles XII of Sweden. The political consequences and interpretation of this defection have resonated in the national histories both of Russia and of Ukraine.

The Russian Orthodox Church laid an anathema (excommunication) on Mazepa's name in 1708 and still refuses to revoke it. The anathema was not recognized by the Ecumenical Patriarchate of Constantinople, which considers it uncanonical and imposed with political motives as a means of political and ideological repression, with no religious, theological or canonical reasons.

Pro-independence and anti-Russian elements in Ukraine from the 18th century onwards were derogatorily referred to as Mazepintsy. The alienation of Mazepa from Ukrainian historiography continued during the Soviet period, but post-1991 in independent Ukraine Mazepa's image has been gradually rehabilitated.

The Ukrainian corvette Hetman Ivan Mazepa of the Ukrainian Navy is named after him.

Early life

Mazepa was probably born on 30 March 1639, in Mazepyntsi, near Bila Tserkva, then part of the Kyiv Voivodeship in the Polish–Lithuanian Commonwealth (today – Drozdy rural council, Bila Tserkva Raion), into a noble Ruthenian-Lithuanian family. His mother was Maryna Mokievska (1624–1707) (known from 1674 to 1675 by her monastic name Maria Magdalena), and his father was Stefan Adam Mazepa (?-1666). Maryna Mokievska came from the family of a Cossack officer who fought alongside Bohdan Khmelnytsky. She gave birth to two children – Ivan and Oleksandra. Stefan Mazepa served as an Otaman of Bila Tserkva (1654), a Cossack representative of the King of the Polish–Lithuanian Rzeczpospolita, and a Czernihów podczaszy (Cup-bearer of Chernihiv, 1662).

Ivan Mazepa was educated first in the Kyiv-Mohyla Academy, then at a Jesuit college in Warsaw. In addition to the Ukrainian language, Russian and Polish, he was fluent in Latin (according to the recollections of the French diplomat Jean Baluze, “with excellent knowledge of this language he could compete with our best Jesuit fathers”) and spoke Italian and German. Pylyp Orlyk testified that Mazepa knew the Tatar language very well, as many Cossack foremen did at that time. As a page, Mazepa was sent to study "gunnery" in Deventer (Dutch Republic) in 1656–1659, during which time he traveled across Western Europe. From 1659 he served at the court of the Polish king, John II Casimir Vasa (reigned 1648–1668) on numerous diplomatic missions to Ukraine. His service at the Polish royal court earned him a reputation as an alleged catholicized "Lyakh" – later the Russian Imperial government would effectively use this slur to discredit Mazepa. During this time there arose the legend of his affair with Madam Falbowska that inspired a number of European Romantics, such Franz Liszt, Victor Hugo, and many others.

In 1663 Mazepa returned home when his father fell ill. After the death of his father (ca. 1665), he inherited the title of the Chernihiv cupbearer. From 1669 to 1673 Mazepa served under Petro Doroshenko (Hetman of Right-Bank Ukraine from 1665 to 1672) as a squadron commander in the Hetman Guard, particularly during Doroshenko's 1672 campaign in Halychyna, and as a chancellor on diplomatic missions to Poland, Crimea, and the Ottoman Empire. From 1674 to 1681 Mazepa served as a "courtier" of Doroshenko's rival Hetman Ivan Samoylovych after Mazepa was captured on the way to Crimea by the Kosh Otaman Ivan Sirko in 1674. From 1677 to 1678 Mazepa participated in the Chyhyryn campaigns during which Yuri Khmelnytsky, with the support from the Ottoman Empire, tried to regain power in Ukraine. The young, educated Mazepa quickly rose through the Cossack ranks, and from 1682 to 1686 he served as an Aide-de-Camp General (Heneralny Osaul).

Hetman

In 1687 Ivan Mazepa accused Samoylovych of conspiring to secede from Russia, secured his ouster, and was elected the Hetman of Left-bank Ukraine in Kolomak, with the support of Vasily Galitzine. At the same time Ivan Mazepa signed the Kolomak Articles, which were based on the Hlukhiv Articles of Demian Mnohohrishny.

Gradually, Mazepa accumulated great wealth, becoming one of Europe's largest land owners. A multitude of churches were built all over Ukraine during his reign in the Ukrainian Baroque style. He founded schools and printing houses, and expanded the Kyiv-Mohyla Academy, the primary educational institution of Ukraine at the time, to accommodate 2,000 students.

In 1702, the Cossacks of Right-bank Ukraine, under the leadership of hetman Semen Paliy, began an uprising against Poland, which after early successes was defeated. Mazepa convinced Russian Tsar Peter I to allow him to intervene, which he successfully did, taking over major portions of Right-bank Ukraine, while Poland was weakened by an invasion of Swedish king Charles XII.

The Great Northern War

In the beginning of the 18th century, as the Russian Empire lost significant territory in the Great Northern War, Peter I decided to reform the Russian army and to centralize control over his realm. In Mazepa's opinion, the strengthening of Russia's central power could put at risk the broad autonomy granted to the Cossack Hetmanate under the Treaty of Pereyaslav in 1654. Attempts to assert control over the Zaporozhian Cossacks included demands of having them fight in any of the tsar's wars, instead of only defending their own land against regional enemies as was agreed to in previous treaties. Now Cossack forces were made to fight in distant wars in Livonia and Lithuania, leaving their own homes unprotected from the Tatars and Poles. Ill-equipped and not properly trained to fight on par with the tactics of modern European armies, Cossacks suffered heavy losses and low morale. The Hetman himself started to feel his post threatened in the face of increasing calls to replace him with one of the abundant generals of the Russian army.

Change of sides
The last straw in the souring relations with Tsar Peter was his refusal to commit any significant force to defend Ukraine against the Polish King Stanisław Leszczyński, an ally of Charles XII of Sweden, who threatened to attack the Cossack Hetmanate in 1708. Peter expected that king Charles of Sweden was going to attack and thought that he could spare no forces. In the opinion of Mazepa, this blatantly violated the Treaty of Pereyaslav, since Russia refused to protect Ukraine's territory and left it to fare on its own. As the Swedish and Polish armies advanced towards Ukraine, Mazepa allied with them on 28 October 1708. However, only 3,000 Cossacks followed their Hetman, with the rest remaining loyal to the Tsar. Mazepa's call to arms was further weakened by the Orthodox Clergy's allegiance to the Tsar. Learning of Mazepa's treason, the Russian army sacked and razed the Cossack Hetmanate capital of Baturyn, killing most of the defending garrison and many common people. The Russian army was ordered to tie the dead Cossacks to crosses and float them down the Dnieper River to the Black Sea.

Those Cossacks who did not side with Mazepa elected a new hetman, Ivan Skoropadsky, on 11 November 1708. The fear of further reprisals and suspicion of Mazepa's newfound Swedish ally prevented most of Ukraine's population from siding with him. Surprisingly, the only significant support that he gathered came from the Zaporozhian Sich, which, though at odds with the Hetman in the past, considered him and the nobility he represented a lesser evil compared with the Tsar. The Sich Cossacks paid dearly for their support of Mazepa, as Peter The Great ordered the Sich to be razed in 1709 and a decree was issued to execute any active Zaporizhian Cossack.

Decisive battle

The Swedish and Russian armies spent the first half of 1709 maneuvering for advantage in the anticipated great battle, and trying to secure the support of the local populace. Finally in June the Battle of Poltava took place. It was won by Russia and Peter the Great, putting an end to Mazepa's hopes of transferring Ukraine into the control of Sweden, which in a treaty had promised independence to Ukraine. Mazepa fled with Charles XII to the Turkish fortress of Bendery, where Mazepa soon died.

Mazepa was buried in Galați (now Romania), but his tomb was disturbed several times and eventually lost as a result of the Sfântul Gheorghe (St. George) Church demolition in 1962.

Title and style
As Hetman of the Zaporozhian Host, Mazepa's style was as follows:
Hetman Ivan Mazepa of the Czar's Illustrious Highness's Zaporozhian Host, Knight of the Glorious Order of the Holy Apostle Andrew.

Historical legacy

Mazepa's decision to abandon his allegiance to the Russian Empire was considered treason by the Russian Tsar and a violation of the Treaty of Pereyaslav. However, others argue that it was Imperial Russia who broke the treaty by not even trying to protect the Cossack homeland during busy fighting abroad while Ukrainian peasants were complaining about the conduct of local Muscovite troops. Many Cossacks had died while building Saint Petersburg, and the Tsar planned to deploy Cossack troops far from their homeland.

The image of a disgraceful traitor persisted throughout Russian and Soviet history. The Russian Orthodox Church anathemaised and excommunicated him for political reasons. Until 1869, his name was even added to the list of traitors publicly cursed in Russian churches during the Feast of Orthodoxy service, along with Pugachev, Razin and False Dmitry I. Later, a positive view of Mazepa was taboo in the Soviet Union and considered as a sign of "Ukrainian bourgeois nationalism". During the years of Perestroika, however, many historical works saw light that viewed Mazepa differently. After Ukraine's independence in 1991, Mazepa was proclaimed a national hero in Ukraine's official historiography and mainstream media, as he was the first post-Pereyaslav Treaty hetman to take a stand against the Tsar, who failed to abide by the Treaty. This view however was disputed by pro-Russian factions. Russia has repeatedly condemned Ukraine for honoring the figure of Ivan Mazepa. According to an April 2009 survey by the Research & Branding Group, 30 percent of the population of Ukraine views Mazepa as "a man who fought for the independence of Ukraine", while 28 percent view him "as a turncoat who joined the enemy's ranks".

During an event in Mazepyntsi to mark the 370th birthday (20 March 2009) of Hetman Mazepa, President Viktor Yushchenko called for the myth about the alleged treason of Mazepa to be dispelled. According to Yushchenko, the hetman wanted to create an independent Ukraine, and architecture thrived in Ukraine over the years of Mazepa's rule: "Ukraine was reviving as the country of European cultural traditions". The same day, around 100 people held a protest in Simferopol against the marking of the 370th birthday of Mazepa. In May 2009 the Russian foreign ministry stated in an answer to Ukraine's preparations to mark the 300th anniversary of the battle of Poltava and plans to erect a monument to Mazepa that those were attempts at an "artificial, far-fetched confrontation with Russia".

Mazepa's portrait is found on the ₴10 (Ukrainian currency) bill.

In August 2009, a monument to the hetman, the work of the sculptor Giennadij Jerszow, was unveiled at Dytynets Park in Chernihiv. The opening was accompanied by clashes between the police and opponents of the Mazepa.

After researching his genealogy in 2009, Ukrainian President Viktor Yushchenko did not rule out that his family is connected with the family of Mazepa.

In August 2009, Yushchenko decreed the resuming of a halted construction of an Ivan Mazepa monument in Poltava. A monument to Mazepa was to be erected on Slava Square in Kyiv in 2010 to fulfill a decree of Yushchenko. In May 2010 Kyiv city civil servants stated the city was ready to establish a monument as soon as the Cabinet of Ukraine would fund this project. According to them the situation was similar to other unrealised monuments such as the "Unification Monument" and a monument to Pylyp Orlyk who in 2010 were conceived in 2002 and 2003 but still not built in 2010. The Poltava City Council on 25 February 2016 voted in favor of the monument. On 6 May 2016 President Petro Poroshenko unveiled the Mazepa monument in Poltava.

The Ivan Mazepa Street in Kyiv, which runs past the Pechersk Lavra, was partly changed to Lavrska Street in July 2010. The move was met with protests.

In Galați (Romania), Mazepa is remembered in the name of two central neighbourhoods (Mazepa I and II) and with a statue in a park on Basarabiei street.

Writings
DUMA
(translation by Dimitri Horbay in the newspaper Svoboda, Ukrainian Weekly Saturday, 22 March 1958, No. 55, Vol. LXV)

While all for peace sincerely preach,
Not all in one direction reach.
Some right, and some left do range,
Yet all are brothers, how very strange.
There is no love, nor does harmony rank
Since we quenched our thirst at the Zhovti's bank.
Through disagreement, non[sic] are saved.
By our own endeavor have we become enslaved.
Aye, brothers, 'tis time to see
That we all cannot masters be!
Not all are grace with knowledge wide
Enough, to over all preside.
Glance at a vessel, if you but will
You'll see many voyagers and still
The master had the ruling hand
The entire ship is at his command.

Even the bee boasts a mother
Whom it obeys,  and no other.
Have mercy, God, for Ukraine
Whose sons are scattered o'er the plain.
Some still are mired in pagan days
Beseeching others to follow their hasty ways:
"Our Motherland, to defend, to cherish!
Let us not permit her to perish!"

Another the Poles for silver serves,
The while he grievingly observes:
"Aged Mother, if Thou but will
Tell why Thou art so deathly ill!"
Wantonly have you been torn asunder
When to the Dnieper, the Turks obtained as plunder
All your forts to make you ail,
So that in the end your health would fail.

A third gives Moscow loquacious praise
Serving her faithfully in divers[sic] ways.
Another the Mother does berate
And damn his own unhappy fate:
"'Twere best not to have sampled life,
Than to live in the midst of all this strife.
From all sides on us they turn
With fire and sword they ruin, burn."
All are wanting in good will.
No proper civility can Thou instil.
"Mouzhik" is the name they have applied,
While bringing subjection, like a tide.
Why didst Thou not teach Thy sons to obey?
Why from Thy side did Thou let them stray?
'Twould have been best if in unity
We had tried to reckon with adversity.

Alone I am bound to fail,
The most I can do is rail:
"Hey! Gentlemen, Generals, pray
Why have you fallen asleep this way?
And you, Sir Colonels, whose hands are clean
Of all politics, no matter the sheen,
Will you not clasp hands and bring 
An end to the bitter suffering?
Our Mother has so long endured, and lo,
Now hurl it down upon the foe.
Recruit the torch to do your labor
Along with the keenest saber.
Stand by your faith to the bitter end,
Your liberty, too, you must defend.
And immortalize in glory bright
That with our sword we protect our right!"

Cultural legacy

The historical events of Mazepa's life have inspired many literary and musical works:

 Lord Byron – Mazeppa, poem (1818)
 Alexander Pushkin – Poltava, poem (1828–1829)
 Victor Hugo – Mazeppa, poem (1829)
 Juliusz Słowacki – Mazeppa, drama (1840)
 Franz Liszt – Mazeppa, symphonic poem (1851); Transcendental Étude No. 4.
 Marie Grandval – Mazeppa, opera (1892)
 Pyotr Ilyich Tchaikovsky – Mazeppa, opera (1881–1883)
 Michael William Balfe – The Page, cantata (1861)
 Taras Shevchenko
 Kondraty Ryleyev
 A Ukrainian-language film by Yuri Ilyenko, loosely based on historical facts and called Молитва за гетьмана Мазепу (Molytva za hetmana Mazepu), was released in 2002.
 The Italian composer Carlo Pedrotti wrote a tragic opera titled Mazeppa in 1861, with libretto by Achille de Lauzieres.

In 2009 the President of Ukraine, Viktor Yushchenko, instituted the Cross of Ivan Mazepa as an award for cultural achievement and service. 
In  2022, Volodymyr Zelenskyy named a Ukrainian Navy Ada-class corvette after him.

See also
 Ivan Mazepa's Hetman's Banner
 List of Ukrainian rulers
 Mazepa family

References

Bibliography
  Tatiana Tairova-Yakovleva. Ivan Mazepa and the Russian Empire. McGill-Queens University Press. 2020. ISBN 978-0-2280-0174-4
 Hrushevsky, M. Illustrated history of Ukraine. "BAO". Donetsk, 2003. 
 Orest Subtelny, The Mazepists: Ukrainian Separatism in the Early Eighteenth Century (1981).
 Thomas M. Prymak, "Voltaire on Mazepa and Early Eighteenth Century Ukraine," Canadian Journal of History, XLVII, 2 (2012), 259–83.
 Thomas M. Prymak, "The Cossack Hetman: Ivan Mazepa in History and Legend from Peter to Pushkin," The Historian, LXXVI, 2 (2014), 237–77.
 Thomas M. Prymak, “Who Betrayed Whom? Or, Who remained Loyal to What? Tsar Peter vs. Hetman Mazepa,” Eighteenth Century Studies, LV, 3 (2022), 359-76.

External links

 
Mazepa at the Encyclopedia of Ukraine by Oleksander Ohloblyn
Ivan Mazepa
The Name of Ivan Mazepa (in Ukrainian)
List of churches and monasteries in building of which invested Ivan Mazepa
 Orest Subtelny,"Mazepa, Peter I and the Question of Treason,"         {
Re-Fighting the Northern War: The Celebration of the Battle of Poltava in Russia. Tatiana Tairova-Yakovleva, Professor, Department of History, St. Petersburg State University. Author: Joseph Dresen (Kennan Institute) 
 Velychenko, S. The Battle of Poltava and the Decline of Cossack-Ukraine in light of Russian and English methods of rule in their Borderlands (1707–1914). historians.in.ua. 5 July 2012.

 
1644 births
1709 deaths
People from Kyiv Oblast
People from Kiev Voivodeship
Hetmans of Zaporizhian Host
Ivan
Politicians of the Russian Empire
Ukrainian diplomats
People excommunicated by the Russian Orthodox Church
National University of Kyiv-Mohyla Academy alumni
Zaporozhian Cossack nobility
Princes of the Holy Roman Empire
People of the Great Northern War
Battle of Poltava
17th-century people of the Holy Roman Empire
18th-century people of the Holy Roman Empire
Patrons of the arts
Recipients of the Order of the White Eagle (Poland)
Traitors in history